Webb Hill is a mountain located in the Catskill Mountains of New York north of Davenport Center. Dutch Hill is located southeast, and Mine Hill is located south of Webb Hill.

References

Mountains of Delaware County, New York
Mountains of New York (state)